Ungkaya Pukan, officially the Municipality of Ungkaya Pukan (Tausūg: Lupah Ungkaya Pukan; Chavacano: Municipalidad de Ungkaya Pukan), is a  municipality in the province of Basilan, Philippines. According to the 2020 census, it has a population of 24,016 people.

Named after Orang Kaya (nobleman) Pukan, a Yakan chieftain that fought valiantly against Pedro Javier Cuevas aka Datu Kalun and his Christianized Yakan warriors backed by the Spaniards.

Ungkaya Pukan was created by Muslim Mindanao Autonomy Act No. 190, ratified by plebiscite on May 22, 2006. It is composed of 12 barangays that were formerly part of Tipo-Tipo.

Geography

Barangays

Ungkaya Pukan is politically subdivided into 12 barangays.

Climate

Demographics

In the 2020 census, Ungkaya Pukan had a population of 24,016.

Economy

References

External links
Ungkaya Pukan Profile at the DTI Cities and Municipalities Competitive Index
[ Philippine Standard Geographic Code]

Municipalities of Basilan